Łódź Żabieniec  is a railway station in Łódź, Poland, located in  district. It serves regional passenger traffic from Łódź Kaliska station to Zgierz, Łowicz, Kutno and Toruń.

History 

Initially, in 1910, the site of station served as guard post, securing a single-level crossing between the Warsaw-Kalisz Railway and a tram line between Łódź and Aleksandrów.

The first building at the station was erected in 1951. Five years later a viaduct for Aleksandrowska street and tram tracks were constructed south to the station.

In 1972 the passenger section of the station, consisting of two single-edged platforms and an underground passage between them and the neighbouring streets, was opened south to the viaduct, leaving the already existing part of station for cargo service.

Current state  
The station's building was repurposed after 2010, due to closure of cash office. It has been adapted to serve as a restaurant.

The underground passage is notorious for being flooded during heavy rains. Refurbishment of the passage and reconstruction of the platforms began in 2019.

Train services
The station is served by the following services:

 Intercity services (IC) Łódź Fabryczna — Bydgoszcz — Gdynia Główna
Intercity services (IC) Gdynia - Gdańsk - Bydgoszcz - Toruń - Kutno - Łódź - Częstochowa - Katowice - Bielsko-Biała
 Intercity services (TLK) Gdynia Główna — Bydgoszcz/Grudziądz — Łódź — Katowice

References 

Railway stations in Poland opened in 1951
Żabieniec
Railway stations served by Przewozy Regionalne InterRegio
Railway stations served by Łódzka Kolej Aglomeracyjna